Salsbury v. Northwestern Bell Telephone Co., 221 N.W.2d 609 (IA 1974), was a case decided by the Iowa Supreme Court concerning contract law.

Background
When John Salsbury was helping to establish Charles City College, Northwestern Bell agreed to make a $5,000 contribution for the next three years but only made one payment. The school sued for breach of contract but the telephone company maintained the contract was unenforceable because they received no consideration for the donations.

Decision
The court adopted the position of the Restatement of Contracts, Second that charitable subscriptions can be enforced even without consideration or detrimental reliance.

References

External links
 

United States contract case law
1974 in United States case law
Iowa state case law
1974 in Iowa
Charles City, Iowa
Education in Floyd County, Iowa
Bell System
Lumen Technologies